Lukas Geniušas (born July 1, 1990 in Moscow) is a Russian-Lithuanian pianist. Geniušas began to study piano at the age of five, and in 1996 he entered the Moscow Frederic Chopin College of Music Performing. 

He studied piano with professor Vera Gornostayeva at the Moscow State Conservatory. Since 2004, he has received the M. Rostropovich Foundation scholarship.

He started to perform in public in 1996, and since that time he performed with various orchestras in the best venues of Moscow, St. Peterburg, Vilnius, Wroclaw and Hamburg. He arranged solo appearances in Russia, Poland, Sweden, Germany, France, Switzerland, Lithuania, and Austria.

Family
His father is the Lithuanian pianist Petras Geniušas, and his mother is Moscow State Conservatory professor Xenia Knorre. Lukas's grandmother is the Russian pianist Vera Gornostayeva. He plays duo piano with his wife Anna Geniushene who is also a highly accomplished pianist, having won the Silver Medal at the Sixteenth Van Cliburn International Piano Competition.

Awards
2002: St. Peterburg, Russia International Piano Competition: "Step to Mastership", 1st place; 
2003: Moscow, Russia First Open Competition of Central Music School, 1st place; 
2004: Moscow, Russia International Frederic Chopin Piano Competition for young pianists, 2nd place; 
2005: Salt Lake City, United States of America Gina Bachauer International Piano Competition, Category Young Artists, 2nd place; 
2007: Scotland, United Kingdom Scottish International Piano Competition, 2nd place;
2008: Moscow, Russia Competition "Youth Delphic Games of Russia", 1st place;
2008: San Marino, Italy International Piano Competition, 2nd place;
2009: Pianello Val Tidone, Italy International Piano Competition "Music della Val Tidone", 1st place;
2010: Salt Lake City, United States of America Gina Bachauer International Piano Competition, 1st place;
2010: Warsaw, Poland XVI International Chopin Piano Competition, 2nd place.
2015: Moscow, Russia International Tchaikovsky Competition, 2nd place (split between Lukas Geniušas and George Li).

References

External links

1990 births
Lithuanian classical pianists
Russian pianists
Living people
Prize-winners of the International Chopin Piano Competition